Interferon regulatory factor 9 is a protein that in humans is encoded by the IRF9 gene, previously known as ISGF3G.

Interactions
IRF9 has been shown to interact with STAT2 and STAT1.

References

Further reading

External links 
 
 
 

Transcription factors